Ophiusa tumidilinea is a moth of the family Erebidae first described by Francis Walker in 1858. It is found in Asia, including India and Thailand.

References

Ophiusa
Moths described in 1858